The Central Army (Modern Turkish: Merkez Ordusu) is one of the field armies of the Army of the Grand National Assembly during the Turkish War of Independence. Its headquarters was located at Amasya.

The Central Army has its foundations in remnants of the III Corps of the Ottoman Army. It engaged in the genocide of Pontic Greeks and suppressed the Koçgiri Rebellion.

Formations

Order of Battle of the XV Corps, December, 1920
In December, 1920, the Central Army was organized as follows:

Labor battalions

Sources

See also
Republic of Pontus
Koçgiri Rebellion
Labour battalion (Turkey)

Field armies of Turkey
Military units and formations of Turkey in the Turkish War of Independence
History of Amasya
History of Sivas Province
History of Samsun Province
History of Sinop Province
History of Amasya Province
History of Tokat Province
History of Çorum Province
History of Yozgat Province
Sivas vilayet
Military units and formations established in 1920
Military units and formations disestablished in 1922